Twyla M. Hansen (born 1949) is an American poet, currently serving as the Nebraska State Poet. She is the third Nebraskan and first woman to hold this position, to which she was appointed by Governor Dave Heineman in November 2013.

Life
Hansen was raised near the town of Lyons in northeast Nebraska and currently lives in Lincoln. She holds a bachelor's degree in horticulture and a master's degree in agroecology from the University of Nebraska-Lincoln. While working as grounds manager and arboretum curator at Nebraska Wesleyan University, Hansen took classes from poet William Kloefkorn, who became one of her mentors. Hansen was appointed to replace Kloefkorn as Nebraska State Poet after his death in 2011.

Awards
 2004 Nebraska Book Award for Poetry (for Potato Soup)
 2012 Nebraska Book Award - Nebraska Center for the Book (for Dirt Songs: A Plains Duet)

Selected publications

Books
 
 
 
 
  Illustrated by Paul Johnsgard.
  With Linda Hasselstrom.

Anthologies

References

External links
 Biography at the Nebraska Center for Writers
 Biography, selected poetry, and scholarly essays at Poetry from the Plains
 Twyla Hansen and Paul Johnsgard's "Prairie Suite: A Celebration"

1949 births
Living people
Poets Laureate of Nebraska
American women poets
Poets from Nebraska
Writers from Lincoln, Nebraska
20th-century American poets
20th-century American women writers
People from Lyons, Nebraska
21st-century American women